John Levy MacDuff  (11 December 1905 – 11 July 1963) was a New Zealand-born lawyer and magistrate. He served as Chief Justice of Fiji from 1962 until his death the following year.

Biography
MacDuff was born in Wellington, New Zealand on 11 December 1905. He was educated at Wellington College before studying at Victoria University College.  He subsequently worked a barrister and solicitor.

During World War II he joined the 27th Machine-Gun Battalion. He was awarded the Military Cross in January 1943 for his efforts in the Western Desert campaign in 1942, and was mentioned in dispatches. He went on to serve as the battalion's  Commanding Officer between September 1943 and February 1944, before becoming Commanding Officer of the 25th Battalion, a post he held until June 1944. After leaving the army, he was appointed Assistant Legal Advisor to the Western Pacific High Commission in Fiji in late 1944.

Shortly after arriving in Fiji, MacDuff became Acting Solicitor-General. He served as a District Magistrate between 1946 and 1948, before becoming a Chief Magistrate, a post he held until relocating to Kenya to serve as a puisne judge in 1953.

MacDuff returned to Fiji in 1962 to become Chief Justice, a role he held until his death at his home in Suva the following year.

References

1905 births
1963 deaths
People from Wellington City
People educated at Wellington College (New Zealand)
Victoria University of Wellington alumni
20th-century New Zealand judges
New Zealand military personnel of World War II
New Zealand recipients of the Military Cross
New Zealand emigrants to Fiji
Chief justices of Fiji
Fijian civil servants
British Kenya judges
Chief Magistrates of Fiji